The following is a list of the MTV Europe Music Award winners and nominees for Best North American Act.

2010s

References

See also
 MTV Video Music Award
 MTV VMA International Viewer's Choice Award for MTV Canada

MTV Europe Music Awards
Canadian music awards
American music awards
Barbadian music
Awards established in 2011